Ben Foudhala El Hakania is a town in north-eastern Algeria.

Localities  of the commune 
The commune of Aïn Touta is composed of 15 localities:

References 

Communes of Batna Province